Army Medical Service may refer to
 Army Medical Service (Germany), a medical branch of the military of Germany
 Army Medical Services, a medical branch of the military of the United Kingdom
 Army Medical Department (United States), formerly called the Army Medical Service
 Army Medical Service (Norway), a former medical branch of the military of Norway